Adamson is a ghost town in Bow Creek Township, Rooks County, Kansas, United States.

History
Adamson was issued a post office in 1875. The post office was discontinued in 1892.  There is nothing left of Adamson.

References

Former populated places in Rooks County, Kansas
Former populated places in Kansas
1875 establishments in Kansas
Populated places established in 1875